This is a chronological list of notable cases decided by the Supreme Court of Canada from appointment of Antonio Lamer as Chief Justice of Canada to his retirement.

19901994

19951999

See also
 List of notable Canadian Courts of Appeals cases

 (1990-2000)